Herbert Gold (born March 9, 1924) is an American novelist.

Early life
Gold was born on March 9, 1924, in Cleveland, Ohio, in to a Russian Jewish family. His parents were Samuel S. and Frieda (Frankel) Gold. His father ran a fruit store and later a grocery store. Gold was raised in Lakewood, a community he was later to memorialize in his first book, Birth of a Hero (1951). He attended Taft Elementary and Lakewood High School in Lakewood, Ohio.

Gold moved to New York City at age 17 after several of his poems had been accepted by New York literary magazines. While there, he studied philosophy at Columbia University and became affiliated with the burgeoning Beat Generation, which resulted in a lifelong friendship with writer Allen Ginsberg. His studies were interrupted when he served in the United States Army from 1943 until 1946, during World War II.

He graduated from Columbia University with a B.A. degree in 1946, and M.A. degree in 1948.

Despite being intertwined with the literary history of San Francisco which greatly defined the Beat Generation, Gold does not consider himself to have ever been a member of this group of writers. In a 2017 interview with Washington Post journalist Jeff Weiss, Gold was referred to as a "Beat-adjacent novelist."

Career
Gold won a Fulbright Scholarship (1948–1951) and moved to Paris with his new wife Edith Zubrin, and while in Paris where he finished his first novel. He attended classes at the Sorbonne in Paris during his Fulbright Scholarship.

After that, he moved around as he wrote, traveling to Haiti and Detroit, and hitchhiking all over the United States. He finally settled in San Francisco, where he became a fixture in the literary scene. In 1958 Gold taught English literature at Cornell University, as Vladimir Nabokov's successor.

Genesis West (Vol. 6), was published in the Winter of 1964 with an interview of Herbert Gold by Gordon Lish.

Personal life
Gold was married to writer and professor Edith Zubrin from 1948 until 1956, ending in divorce. From this marriage Gold is father of daughters Ann Gold and Judith Gold. Edith Zubrin died in 2000.

Gold was married to the daughter of J. Richardson Dilworth, Melissa Dilworth, from 1968 until 1975, with whom he had three children: daughter Nina Gold and twin boys Ari Gold and Ethan Gold. After they divorced, Melissa married again, and she later became involved with concert promoter Bill Graham. She died with Graham in an accidental helicopter crash in 1991.

In contrast to many in the Beat Generation, Gold has lived in an apartment in San Francisco's more conservative, tourist friendly Russian Hill neighborhood since 1961.

Publications

Books

Essays and short stories

References

External links
 
 Herbert Gold in News from the Republic of Letters:
 Bewitched, Bothered and Begoogled: Nos. 14/15
 The Tragedy You Can Dance To: No. 13
 Finding Aid to the Herbert Gold Papers, 1942-2011, The Bancroft Library

1924 births
Living people
20th-century American novelists
American male novelists
Columbia College (New York) alumni
Writers from Cleveland
People from Lakewood, Ohio
Jewish American writers
Writers from the San Francisco Bay Area
PEN Oakland/Josephine Miles Literary Award winners
20th-century American male writers
Novelists from Ohio
United States Army personnel of World War II
American expatriates in France
21st-century American Jews
Fulbright alumni